Legacy Christian Academy (formerly known as Meadow Creek Christian School) is a private Christian school located in Andover, Minnesota. It has approximately 475 students in pre-school through 12th grade.

Academically, Legacy is accredited by the Association of Christian Schools International.  Athletically, it is a 'single A' school which competes as part of the Minnesota State High School League in the Minnesota Christian Athletic Association conference.

References

External links 
 Legacy Christian Academy
 Minnesota State High School League
 Legacy Christian Athletics Home Page

Christian schools in Minnesota
Private high schools in Minnesota
Educational institutions established in 1976
Schools in Anoka County, Minnesota
Private middle schools in Minnesota
Private elementary schools in Minnesota
1976 establishments in Minnesota